Smyrna is a neighborhood of Louisville, Kentucky centered along Smyrna Road and Applegate Lane.

References

Neighborhoods in Louisville, Kentucky